Cleja River may refer to:

 Cleja, a tributary of the Iminog in Olt County
 Cleja River (Siret)

See also 
 Cleja, a commune in Bacău County, Romania
 Clejani, a commune in Giurgiu County, Romania